Lepthoplosternum pectorale is a species of catfish of the family Callichthyidae.  It is found in Argentina, Brazil and Paraguay where it occurs in the Paraguay River.

References
 

Callichthyidae
Fish of South America
Fish of Argentina
Fish of Brazil
Fish of Paraguay
Taxa named by George Albert Boulenger
Fish described in 1895